The Upper Xiajiadian culture (c. 1000-600 BC) was a Bronze Age archaeological culture in Northeast China derived from the Eurasian steppe bronze tradition.

A culture found mainly in southeastern Inner Mongolia, northern Hebei and western Liaoning, China the Upper Xiajiadian's range was slightly larger than that of the Lower Xiajiadian reaching areas north of the Xilamulun River. Compared to the Lower Xiajiadian culture, population levels were lower, less dense, and more widespread. The culture still relied heavily on agriculture, but also moved toward a more pastoral, nomadic lifestyle. The social structure changed from being an acephalous or tribal society into a more chiefdom-oriented society. The type site is represented by the upper layer at Xiajiadian, Chifeng, Inner Mongolia. 

The Upper Xiajiadian culture produced inferior ceramic artifacts compared to those of the Lower Xiajiadian culture, although this was compensated by their superior bronze, bone, and stone artifacts. The culture is well known for its bronze objects, producing bronze daggers, axes, chisels, arrowheads, knives, and helmets. Upper Xiajiadian bronzes were decorated with animal and natural motifs, which suggest possible Scythian affinities and indicate continued cultural contact and exchange across the Eurasian steppes. The locally produced bronze vessels were much smaller than comparable bronzes from Zhou states. In the later periods, Zhou-style dagger-axes and bronze vessels were found at Upper Xiajiadian sites. In one case, bronze vessels belonging to the ruling family of the State of Xu were discovered in an Upper Xiajiadian grave at Xiaoheishigou (小黑石沟), evidenced by the inscriptions on one of the vessels. 

Upper Xiajiadian culture shows evidence of a drastic shift in lifestyle compared to that of the Lower Xiajiadian culture. The Upper Xiajiadian culture placed less emphasis on permanent structures, preferring to reoccupy Lower Xiajiadian structures or reuse Lower Xiajiadian stones for building Upper Xiajiadian structures. The horse became important to the culture, as evidenced by the remains of horses and horse paraphernalia found at Upper Xiajiadian sites. The culture also moved away from a centralized social organization, as no evidence for large public works has been discovered at Upper Xiajiadian sites. From relying on pigs to a dependence on sheep and goats for its primary source of domesticated protein, the culture built more extravagant graves for its elites than the Lower Xiajiadian, with more numerous and elaborate burial offerings. Upper Xiajiadian burials were typically marked by cairns and tumuli.

See also
 Lower Xiajiadian culture

References

Bibliography
 
 

Archaeology of Inner Mongolia
Bronze Age cultures of Asia
Archaeological cultures of China
Bronze Age in China
1st millennium BC in China